Víctor Rodolfo Espárrago Videla (born 6 October 1944 in Montevideo) is a Uruguayan football coach and former midfielder.

International career
He was capped 67 times for the national team between 1966 and 1974. His playing career highlight came when he was an important member of the Uruguayan squad which achieved fourth place at the 1970 FIFA World Cup. 

In that tournament, he scored a winning goal in extra-time of the quarter-final against the USSR.

Coaching career
He has coached several teams in Spain since 1985. Since July 1, 2004 he has been the head coach of Cádiz CF, which was also the first team he coached in the Spanish first division. On 10 January 2010 after the exoneration of Javi Gracia, after the defeat of Real Sociedad (1-4), Cádiz has signed him as new manager.

Coaching career summary
Recreativo de Huelva (1985–1987)
Cádiz CF (1987–1988)
Valencia CF (1988–1991)
Sevilla FC (1991–1992)
Albacete Balompié (1992–1994)
Real Valladolid (1994–1995)
Sevilla FC (1995–1996)
Real Zaragoza (1996–1997)
Cádiz CF (2004–2006)
Cádiz CF (2010)

External links
 
 
 Víctor Espárrago at cadistas1910.com

1944 births
Living people
Uruguayan footballers
Uruguayan expatriate footballers
Uruguayan Primera División players
Club Nacional de Football players
Uruguayan football managers
Uruguayan expatriate football managers
La Liga managers
Cádiz CF managers
Valencia CF managers
Real Valladolid managers
Real Zaragoza managers
Albacete Balompié managers
Sevilla FC managers
Uruguay international footballers
1966 FIFA World Cup players
1970 FIFA World Cup players
1974 FIFA World Cup players
Footballers from Montevideo
Recreativo de Huelva players
Sevilla FC players
Expatriate footballers in Spain

Association football midfielders